The Terrorist Next Door may refer to:

 The Terrorist Next Door (novel), by Sheldon Siegel
 The Terrorist Next Door (Levitas book), by Daniel Levitas